The 2018–19 East Carolina Pirates men's basketball team represented East Carolina University during the 2018–19 NCAA Division I men's basketball season. The Pirates were led by first year head coach, Joe Dooley, who previously coached the Pirates from 1995–1999, and played their home games at Williams Arena at Minges Coliseum as fifth-year members of the American Athletic Conference. The Pirates finished the season 10–21, 3–15 in AAC play to finish in 11th place. They lost in the first round of the AAC tournament to Wichita State.

Previous season
The Pirates finished the 2017–18 season 10–20, 4–14 in AAC play to finish in 11th place. They lost in the first round of the AAC tournament to UCF.

Following a 2–4 start to the season, eighth-year head coach Jeff Lebo announced his resignation from ECU on November 29, 2017 and Perry was named interim head coach. On April 4, 2018 the school announced that Florida Gulf Coast head coach Joe Dooley, who coached the Pirates from 1995 to 1999, would return as head coach.

Offseason

Departures

Recruiting class of 2018

Recruiting class of 2019

Roster

Schedule and results

|-
!colspan=9 style=| Non-conference regular season

|-
!colspan=9 style=| AAC regular season

|-
!colspan=9 style=|AAC tournament

References

East Carolina Pirates men's basketball seasons
East Carolina
East Carolina Pirates men's basketball
East Carolina Pirates men's basketball